Wippra is a former municipality in the Mansfeld-Südharz district, Saxony-Anhalt, Germany. Since 1 January 2008, it has been part of the town of Sangerhausen.

References

Former municipalities in Saxony-Anhalt
Mansfeld-Südharz
Villages in the Harz